Khwaja Umari (Khwajeh 'Omri, Qal'eh-ye Khwajeh) is a village and the center of Khwaja Umari District, Ghazni Province, Afghanistan.

See also
 Khwaja Umari District
 Ghazni Province

References

Populated places in Ghazni Province